Les Créations de Narisawa is a French restaurant in Minato, Tokyo, Japan. It opened in Minami Aoyama in November 2003.

Awards
Les Créations de Narisawa received one Michelin star in the 2008 Michelin Guide Tokyo, and then two stars in 2010. 
The restaurant was voted 20th best in the world in Restaurant (magazine) Top 50 2009, and the best restaurant in Asia. 
Most recently, the restaurant was named 8th in 2016.

Chef
Chef Yoshihiro Narisawa was born on 11 April 1969 in Aichi Prefecture, Japan. He trained in Switzerland under Frédy Girardet, in France under Joël Robuchon, and in Italy at Antica Osteria del Ponte.

Narisawa returned from Europe after 9 years and opened his own first restaurant in Odawara, Kanagawa, and named it "La Napoule". He subsequently moved the entire operation to central Tokyo.

References

External links
 Les Créations de Narisawa
 The Japan Times article May 2009 

Restaurants in Tokyo
Michelin Guide starred restaurants in Japan
French restaurants in Japan
Restaurants established in 2003
2003 establishments in Japan